Azamatbi Pshnatlov (born 9 June 1994) is a Russian wrestler who participated at the 2010 Summer Youth Olympics in Singapore. He won the gold medal in the boys' freestyle 63 kg event, defeating Bakhodur Kadarov of Tajikistan in the final.

References 

Wrestlers at the 2010 Summer Youth Olympics
Living people
Russian male sport wrestlers
Year of birth missing (living people)
Youth Olympic gold medalists for Russia